Georgia is a country in the Caucasus, with an access to the Black Sea. There are four functioning seaports—Batumi, Poti, Kulevi, and Supsa—in Georgia and one, that of Anaklia, is under construction.  Four more ports—Sukhumi, Gudauta, Gagra, and Ochamchire—are located in occupied Abkhazia and their operation is officially suspended by Georgia.

References